Carex alligata, the Hawaiʻi sedge, is a species of sedge that is endemic to Hawaii.

It was first described in 1867 by American botanist Francis Boott (1792–1863).

References

alligata
Endemic flora of Hawaii
Flora without expected TNC conservation status